Caitlin Ryan may refer to:
Caitlin Regal (née Ryan), New Zealand canoeist
Caitlin Ryan (social worker), American social worker and researcher
Caitlin Ryan (Degrassi), a character in the Canadian drama franchise Degrassi
Caitlin Ryan, a character in the British soap opera Coronation Street